The National Society of Film Critics Award for Best Supporting Actor is an annual film award given by the National Society of Film Critics.

The awards was given for the first time in 1968 (honoring films of 1967).

Winners

 † = Winner of the Academy Award for Best Supporting Actor
 ‡ = Nominated for the Academy Award for Best Supporting Actor

1960s

1970s

1980s

1990s

2000s

2010s

2020s

Multiple awards
2 wins
 Gene Hackman (1967, 1992)
 Jack Nicholson (1969, 1983)

See also
 National Board of Review Award for Best Supporting Actor
 New York Film Critics Circle Award for Best Supporting Actor
 Los Angeles Film Critics Association Award for Best Supporting Actor

References

National Society of Film Critics Awards
Film awards for supporting actor